ATP-dependent Clp protease proteolytic subunit (ClpP) is an enzyme that in humans is encoded by the CLPP gene. This protein is an essential component to form the protein complex of Clp protease (Endopeptidase Clp).

Structure 
Enzyme ClpP is a highly conserved serine protease present throughout bacteria and also found in the mitochondria  and chloroplasts of eukaryotic cells. The ClpP monomer is folded into three subdomains: the "handle", the globular "head", and the N-terminal region. By itself, ClpP can assemble into a tetradecamer complex (14-members) and form a closed proteolytic chamber. A fully assembled Clp protease complex has a barrel-shaped structure in which two stacked ring of proteolytic subunits (ClpP or ClpQ) are either sandwiched between two rings or single-caped by one ring of ATPase-active chaperon subunits (ClpA, ClpC, ClpE, ClpX or ClpY). ClpXP is presented in almost all bacteria while ClpA is found in the Gram-negative bacteria, ClpC in Gram-Positive bacteria and cyanobacteria. ClpAP,  ClpXP and ClpYQ coexist in E. Coli while only ClpXP complex in present in humans.

Some bacteria have multiple ClpPs, like P. aeruginosa, which has two distinct ClpP isoforms ClpP1 and ClpP2. These isoforms have differences in assembly and functional characteristics. P. aeruginosa  produces  two forms of the ClpP peptidase, PaClpP114 and PaClpP17P27, which in complex with ClpX or ClpA form functional proteases. PaClpP2 is not able to form an active peptidase on its own but it needs PaClpP1 to be active.

Function 
In bacteria, it was shown that ClpP is able to cleave full-length proteins without being associated with ClpA but the degradation is at a much slower rate. Fully functional Clp protease requires the participation of AAA+ ATPase. These ClpX chaperons recognize, unfold and transfer protein substrates to proteolytic core formed by ClpP tetradecamer. The proteolytic sites of ClpP subunits contain hydrophobic grooves which recruit substrate and host the catalytic triad Asp-His-Ser. 
In several bacteria, such as E. coli, proteins tagged with the SsrA peptide (ANDENYALAA) encoded by tmRNA are digested by Clp proteases. Proteases target damaged or misfolded proteins, transcription factors and signaling proteins in bacteria to coordinate complex cell responses and thus they have robust importance for the physiology and virulence of bacteria.

In P. aeruginosa, ClpP1 is expressed constitutively throughout growth whereas ClpP2 expression is induced 10-fold in stationary phase. Quorum-sensing transcription factor LasR activates expression of ClpP2 in stationary phase. ClpP1 and ClpP2 have differential cleavage specificities which contributes to total peptidase activity of PaClpP17P27. Peptidase and protease action of PaClpP17P27 produces cleavage products that enhance biofilm formation in P. aeruginosa.

The protein encoded by this gene belongs to the peptidase family S14 and hydrolyzes proteins into small peptides in the presence of ATP and magnesium. The protein is transported into mitochondrial matrix and is associated with the inner mitochondrial membrane.

Clinical significance
ClpP protease is a major contributor for mitochondrial protein quality control system and removing damaged or misfolded proteins in mitochondrial matrix. Defects in mitochondrial Clp proteases have been associated with the progression of neurodegenerative diseases while upregulation of ClpP proteases has been implicated in preventing premature aging.

Recessive CLPP mutations were recently observed in the human Perrault variant associating with ovarian failure and sensorineural hearing loss, in parallel with growth retardation. The clinical phenotype was accompanied by the accumulation of ClpP associating partner chaperon ClpX, mtRNA, and inflammatory factors. The disease pathological cause probably involves deficient clearance of mitochondrial components and inflammatory tissue destruction.

ClpP has been shown to be over-expressed in the tumour cells of a subset of cancer patients. This can be exploited by therapeutic agents, including by the hyperactivation of ClpP to cause selective cancer cell lethality.

Intracellular proteases have a role in bacterial virulence. Deletion of ClpP causes growth inhibition or loss of virulence in many bacterial species which makes them a good target for developing new antimicrobial agents. Currently there are no approved antimicrobial agents that target bacterial proteases. PaClpP2 is required for proper biofilm development in opportunistic pathogen P. aeruginosa. Deletion of PaClpP2 or mutation of PaClpP2 active site notably decrease biofilm thickness of P. aeruginosa. This founding has relevance in development of new antimicrobial agents against P. aeruginosa.

See also 
CLP protease family
Endopeptidase Clp
Protease
Transfer-messenger RNA

References

Further reading

External links 
 MEROPS entry for ClpP
 

Proteases
Post-translational modification
EC 3.4.21